Annapolis, Nova Scotia may refer to:

 Annapolis Royal, Nova Scotia, a historic town, former colonial capital of Nova Scotia and currently the county seat for Annapolis County
 Annapolis County, Nova Scotia, one of Nova Scotia's 18 counties
 Annapolis River, running through the western part of the Annapolis Valley
 Annapolis Valley, in northwestern Nova Scotia along the Bay of Fundy famous for its scenery and agricultural products
 Annapolis Basin, a sub-basin of the Bay of Fundy
 , the name of two Canadian warships